Psilopsida may refer to:
 Psilotopsida or Psilopsida, a class of ferns in current classifications
 Psilophytopsida or Psilopsida, a now obsolete class used for a group of extinct plants